Arizaro volcanic field is a group of volcanoes west of the Salar de Arizaro.

The volcanic field lies above the western shores of the Salar de Arizaro. It consists of numerous Pleistocene basaltic andesite lava flows, as well as cinder cones with Holocene basaltic lava flows. Most centres are roughly aligned in northeast-southwest direction.

The volcanic field lies in the Puna, a high plateau generated by the subduction of the Nazca Plate beneath the South America Plate. The terrain consists mainly of Miocene volcaniclastic rocks with a single outcrop of Ordovician granodiorite. Parts of the area are covered by Quaternary alluvium and conglomerates. The basement rocks are influenced by normal faulting.

The volcanism in the field has been explained by lithospheric delamination, a process by which part of the lower lithosphere founders into the mantle. Such a process is accompanied by uplift of the abovelying crust and often by volcanism of mainly small volume. Seismic imagery has been used to argue for the existence of delaminated crust in the mantle above the downgoing Nazca Plate slab beneath the Arizaro region.

The age of the lavas has been determined by argon-argon dating. The northernmost lava flow has yielded an age of 80,000 ± 60,000 years before present, while a southern lava flow has been dated to 130,000 ± 10,000 years before present and a date of 2.52 ± 0.05 million years ago was found on a central lava flow; this last lava flow shows evidence of younger faulting.

References

Sources 

 

Volcanoes of Argentina
Pleistocene volcanoes
Holocene volcanoes